The cast of the television series MythBusters perform experiments to verify or debunk urban legends, old wives' tales, and the like. This is a list of the various myths tested on the show, as well as the results of the experiments (the myth is Busted, Plausible, or Confirmed).

Episode overview

Episode 44 – "Paper Crossbow"
 Original air date: January 11, 2006

Paper Crossbow
This myth was the first entry among those listed as one of the twelve myths that would not be tested in MythBusters: The Explosive Truth Behind 30 of the Most Perplexing Urban Legends of All Time.  In an interview for Skeptic magazine, the myth apparently was considered too controversial by Discovery Channel, which thought testing the myth could provoke prisoners to try similar things.

Vodka Myths II
Kari, Tory, and Grant tested to see if vodka...

Episode 45 – "Shredded Plane"
 Original air date: January 18, 2006

Shredded Plane
One widely circulated photo showed a systematically and neatly sliced Piper PA-44 Seminole. The damage was caused by...

Fire Without Matches
Fire can be started...

Episode 46 – "Archimedes Death Ray"
 Original air date: January 25, 2006
This was the third episode where Myths from previous episodes were revisited, as well as the third episode to focus on just one experiment.

This episode, referred to as the MythBusters Mailbag Special: The Great Archimedes Burn-Off from within the episode itself, saw a retest of the Ancient Death Ray myth after fans of the series contested their original decision.  To this end, the MythBusters commissioned a contest, challenging viewers to prove the myth plausible.

For the smaller-scale version, two finalists, the team of Kari Lukes and Jess Nelson, both from UCSB, and the team of Brenden Millstein (Harvard) and Stephen Marsh (Lawrence Berkeley National Laboratory) were chosen to compete against the MythBusters' own entry in the retest (which was disqualified when it was found that the MythBusters had not followed the contest rules they had set out themselves). Only one entrant (Mike Bushroe, a NASA space scientist) entered a full-scale contest; however, the winning entry was destroyed en route for the retest.

The MythBusters also invited a team from MIT, led by Professor David Wallace, who had independently verified that a ship could be lit from afar using an array of mirrors, to retest the myth with Archimedean-era technology instead of the modern technology used in their own experiment.

While it was shown extensively that it is, in fact, plausible that an array of mirrors (or a parabolic mirror) could set objects on fire, the MythBusters stood by their original Busted verdict because of many factors:
 Syracuse, where the myth was supposed to take place, faced east, thus could not take advantage of the more intense midday rays, instead relying on less powerful morning rays.
 The death ray would not work during cloudy weather.
 Enemy ships were likely to be moving targets, thus the mirrors would need to be constantly refocused.
 The historical records: no mention was made of the use of fire during the Battle of Syracuse until 300 years after the event, and no mention of mirrors until 800 years after the event.
 The impossibly large numbers of mirrors and personnel needed to light a boat with any reasonable speed
 The availability of other weapons that were much more effective: flaming arrows and Molotov cocktail were more reliable at setting an enemy ship ablaze, and were more effective over longer distances.

The MythBusters also addressed fans' criticisms that suggested they try to light the ships' sails instead of the body of the ship, and showed the sails diffused the light due to their composition and the wind blowing against them, thus could not be as easily set on fire compared to the body of the ship.

The myth would be re-visited in 2010 in the President's Challenge only to be re-busted.

Episode 47 – "Helium Football"
 Original air date: February 1, 2006

Helium Football
Adam and Jamie took on a myth prevalent around football circles, made more prevalent during the time of prolific punter Ray Guy, whose kicks carried so much distance and had so much hangtime, some had suspected the footballs he used were filled with helium.

Catching a Bullet in Your Teeth
The Build Team took on the bullet catch magic trick, and see whether it is possible to do the trick for real.

Episode 48 – "Franklin's Kite"
 Original air date: March 8, 2006

Franklin's Kite
The Build Team took on a piece of American folklore regarding Benjamin Franklin's discovery of lightning as electricity. The folklore description is not historically accurate (as mentioned by the Build Team), although it is a popular misconception.

Facts About Flatulence
In this myth, Adam and Jamie tested some of the more prevalent myths based on flatulence.  Throughout the myth, the MythBusters were careful to only use the scientific term 'flatus' as opposed to the more common 'fart', to prevent coming off as insensitive to the viewers (although 'fart' had been used and aired uncensored by the MythBusters before and since).

Flatulence can be induced by consuming...

Two additional myths were filmed but not aired as part of the broadcast episode. These have been shown in an outtakes reel at live appearances by the MythBusters.

Do Girls Pass Gas?

Lighting the Emission
This is also referred to as "Flatus Burning."

Episode 49 – "Cell Phones on Planes"
 Original air date: March 15, 2006

Helium Raft

Cell Phones on a Plane

Episode 50 – "Bullets Fired Up"
 Original air date: April 19, 2006

Bullets Fired Up

Vodka Myths III
Vodka can...

Episode 51 – "Myths Re-Opened"
 Original air date: April 26, 2006

This was the fourth episode in which myths were retested (counting the Archimedes Death Ray revisit).

Salami Rocket
The MythBusters revisited the Confederate Rocket myth with some new information from viewers. This was revisited in More Myths Revisited.

Splitting an Arrow
At the insistence of viewers, the team retested the popular arrow-splitting myth seen in the film The Adventures of Robin Hood.

Guns Fired Underwater
It has already been shown that, in some cases, bullets become non-lethal when fired into water, but what happens when the whole gun is fired under water?

Episode 52 – "Mind Control"
 Original air date: May 3, 2006

Painting With Explosives
This myth originated from the episode "Do-It-Yourself, Mr. Bean" of the British comedy series Mr. Bean starring Rowan Atkinson.

Mind Control
Remote, non-consensual mind control can be achieved by...

Episode 53 – "Exploding Pants"
 Original air date: May 10, 2006

Exploding Pants

This myth came from New Zealand in the early 1930s, where an epidemic of exploding pants had rampaged, injuring and even killing farmers. The culprit was a then-unfamiliar chemical substance that farmers began using in large quantities at the time.

The Great Gas Conspiracy

The "Great Gas Conspiracy" mentioned in the myth is the conspiracy theory that gasoline companies are secretly in league with the car manufacturers to produce fuel-inefficient vehicles, to fatten their profits and split the difference. The myths tested were ways found on the Internet that one can supposedly beat this conglomerate and get cheap, easy, and spectacularly improved fuel efficiency for cars. The cars were a Toyota Camry and an Oldsmobile Toronado.

Theories tested to see if cheap fuel efficiency can be achieved with...

Episode 54 – "Crimes and Myth-Demeanors 1"
 Original air date: July 12, 2006
The MythBusters tested the validity of some Hollywood heist scenes, using a purpose-built "assault course" with Grant operating the security system as mission controller, while two "crack teams" (Adam and Jamie, plus Tory and Kari) attempted alternate myths.

Air Duct Climb
Though present in a number of movies, the myth came primarily from the movie Firetrap, in which Max Hopper (Dean Cain) scales a duct silently using magnets. Adam and Jamie were tasked with the entry phase – scaling a 20-foot air duct stealthily. After each had devised his own system, they tested whether a person can surreptitiously scale an air duct by using a system of...

Laser Beam Dodge
Before Grant started the myth, he stated that he found that the highly visible, brightly colored light beams seen in movies do not exist in the real world, as not only would it defeat the purpose of making the laser system hard to get around, but real light moves far too quickly to be seen by the naked eye, thereby making such laser systems impossible to create in the first place. In its place, he fashioned a makeshift system using laser pointers that worked on the same principle (breaking the beam sets off the alarm.)

Each part of the myth came from the movie Entrapment – specifically, the scene where Gin Baker (Catherine Zeta-Jones) and Mac MacDougal (Sean Connery) infiltrate Bedford Palace to steal a priceless mask. Kari and Tory took this on as their first challenge and tested whether a person can successfully navigate a system of laser beam detectors by...

Infrared Beam Dodge
After getting through the visible lasers, Kari and Tory faced the real-world equivalent: infrared photo-beam detectors. They tested the following methods:

Glass Door Forced Entry
To access the jewelry room, Adam and Jamie tested whether glass doors can be breached silently (i.e. without setting off a sonar alarm trained to detect smashing). This was inspired by films often featuring scenes where cat burglars cut holes in glass and remove them with suction cups. They tested the following techniques in an hour-long practice session and during the test itself...

Fooling the Pressure Sensor
This myth also came from Entrapment and is the final act of the Bedford Palace mask heist. Tory and Kari faced this as their final challenge, attempting to retrieve a golden Buster idol while testing whether a person can successfully fool a pressure sensor under a glass case by...

Safecracking
As their final challenge, Adam and Jamie were tasked with cracking a safe that turned out to contain a golden jeweled scepter. Adam took the lead and tested whether a safe can be quickly cracked by...

Scaling a Building
In a final twist, Grant and Tory challenged Adam to scale a 23-story building using his suction cups as a cat burglar might in order to get to a helicopter on the roof.

Episode 55 – "Steam Cannon"
 Original air date: July 19, 2006

Cereal Nutrition
A popular saying states that sugary cereal is less nutritious than its box.

Note: Adam and Jamie admitted in an interview that they tried an earlier test of this myth using rats in cooperation with a university. However, of the three groups they used, they found that one of the rats in the group fed cardboard ate the others in the sample when they returned. The decision was later made by Discovery to leave the segment unaired.

Steam Cannon
A diagram by Leonardo da Vinci blueprints a steam-powered cannon that Archimedes supposedly built.

The MythBusters Teeth Challenge
This is also referred to as "Which has the whitest teeth." This myth was less a challenge than an inside joke. The MythBusters received many emails from fans complaining about Adam's brown teeth. It was not aired in the US. However, on the Discovery Europe version, it is included in the episode.

Episode 56 – "Whirlpool/Snowplow"
 Original air date: July 26, 2006

Whirlpool of Death
Whirlpools are an ancient maritime fear. According to the myth, a tidal whirlpool can sink...

Snowplow Flips Car
A fan claims that he saw a car capsize when a snowplow passed by in the opposite direction at high speed.

Episode 57 – "Mentos and Soda"
 Original air date: August 9, 2006

Diet Coke and Mentos
This is the first segment not to be assigned a "Busted", "Plausible" or "Confirmed" rating, as there was no myth to be proved or disproved. Adam and Jamie did the tests simply to dissect the process and determine what actually makes a so-called Diet Coke and Mentos eruption, such as the ones seen on Kari's FHM shoot and on EepyBird.com. However, they did compare their results to the many differing theories given by experts as to how the geyser works, "busting" all of them.  (None of the theories had the full list of contributing factors for the geyser, only partial explanations.)

In this episode, Adam and Jamie also created homemade pyrotechnics using water, liquid soap, and methane, and smoke bombs from saltpeter and sugar; demonstrated a way to blow the canister off a stack of Pringles chips by using hydrogen gas, leaving the chips intact; and assembled a dry ice bomb. Adam also implies that more improvised explosives may be tested for a future episode. Despite the "do not try this at home" disclaimers, the MythBusters concluded that Diet Coke and Mentos geysers are safe enough for people to try, even for children (with the exception of getting in trouble by their parents).

Stamp on a Helicopter

Episode 58 – "Shattering Subwoofer"
 Original air date: August 16, 2006

Shattering Subwoofer

Rough Road Driving

A spinoff myth was tested in More Myths Revisited

Episode 59 – "Crimes and Myth-Demeanors 2"
 Original air date: August 23, 2006

As opposed to the earlier "Crimes and Myth-Demeanors", which focused on security systems as seen in movies, the MythBusters attempted to break real-world security systems, which were all installed in the original assault course.

Fingerprint Lock
Fingerprint readers take a sample of a fingerprint and match it with an approved-person database. The particular door-mounted scanner tested optically samples the fingerprint, and had some extra "liveness-sensing" features that supposedly looks for pulse, body heat, and sweat (though, in the end, the door-scanner ended up being fooled much easier than the low-tech fingerprint scanner on Jamie's laptop).

The process was twofold – first, obtaining the thumbprint for the lock (which Kari did by tricking Grant into copying a stack of CDs, thus giving them a copy of the master print) and then devising a method of successfully transcribing the fingerprint to the point that it could be used to bypass the lock. Adam and Jamie used various techniques before finding a technique involving copper-coated circuit boards, acetate, acid washing, and manually amplifying the lines in the fingerprint to their original quality.

After that, the two of them transcribed Grant's thumbprint onto various mediums and then tested whether the biometric fingerprint lock could be cracked by...

Thermal Motion Sensor
Thermographic cameras note any changes in the temperature gradient within its field of view (as seen in the 1992 film Sneakers).  Kari, Tory and Grant tested whether a thermal motion sensor can be fooled by...

Ultrasonic Motion Sensor
Ultrasonic motion detectors note any Doppler shifts caused by a moving intruder.  Kari, Tory and Grant tested whether an ultrasonic motion detector can be fooled by...

Water Safe
This myth was based on a scene from the movie The Score where Nick Wells (Robert De Niro) uses this technique to break into a safe containing a glass relocker.

Episode 60 – "Earthquake Machine"
 Original air date: August 30, 2006

Miniature Earthquake Machine
The MythBusters tested one of Nikola Tesla's publications.

Exploding Lava Lamp
Kari, Tory and Grant began by examining the news story that 24-year-old Philip Quinn had been killed two years beforehand in his trailer home in Kent, Washington after he heated a lava lamp on his stove, only for it to blow up and send a glass shard into his chest. This earned them the moniker of "MSI: Myth Scene Investigation", an homage to CSI. They eventually tested whether the following can potentially blow up with lethal consequences if heated on a stove by heating the material in question on a stove and placing a ballistic gel torso with an actual human ribcage and a fake heart near the stove so that they could examine potential injuries:

Episode 61 – "Deadly Straw"
 Original air date: September 6, 2006

Straw Through a Palm Tree

Primary Perception
The Build Team tested world-renowned polygrapher Cleve Backster's theory of primary perception.

Episode SP9 – "Mega Movie Myths"
 Original air date: September 13, 2006
Adam, Jamie, Buster, and the Build Team are watching movie myths they have done in the past, and decide to dedicate a whole episode to them. This episode is a two-hour special.

Episode 62 – "Killer Cable Snaps"
 Original air date: October 11, 2006

Killer Cable Slice

Pottery Record (Archaeoacoustics)

Episode 63 – "Air Cylinder Rocket"
 Original air date: October 18, 2006

Air Cylinder of Death
A compressed air cylinder can...

Gunpowder Engine

Episode 64 – "More Myths Revisited"
 Original air date: October 25, 2006

This was the fifth episode where myths from previous episodes were revisited.

Sword vs. Gun

Rough Road Driving

Salami Rocket
This marked the first time a Confirmed myth was disputed. In this case, the claim was that the rocket launched not due to the two-part hybrid reaction, but simply due to the release of the pressurized nitrous oxide.

Tailgate Up vs. Tailgate Down

Episode 65 – "Exploding Lighter"
 Original air date: November 1, 2006

Exploding Lighter

The MythBusters tested the following myths concerning standard disposable butane lighters.

Gunslinger Myths

Using a Colt Peacemaker and a Navy revolver, the MythBusters tested whether an Old West gunslinger could...

Episode 66 – "Concrete Glider"
 Original air date: November 8, 2006

Concrete Glider
This myth was part of a well-known engineering cliché: "Like a lead balloon, you cannot make a concrete glider fly."

See also Lead Balloon.

Train Suction

Episode 67 – "Firearms Folklore"
 Original air date: November 29, 2006
This is the last episode to use the original opening sequence and the last before filming started in high-definition.

Firearms Folklore
A portion of this myth was revisited in "More Myths Reopened".

Hammer vs. Hammer
This myth was brought up by concerned viewers, who feared that Jamie was in risk of suffering from the myth each time he banged two hammers together as part of a build.

This myth was revisited in "More Myths Reopened".

Episode 68 – "Anti-Gravity Device"
 Original air date: December 6, 2006
This was the first episode to feature the new opening sequence and be filmed in high-definition.

Anti-gravity

Anti-gravity is a hypothetical force that eliminates the effects of gravity on an object (as opposed to counteracting it).  The MythBusters tested various devices that claimed to produce anti-gravity.

Christmas Lights

Christmas tree fires are common during the winter holidays, and cause millions of dollars in damage annually in America alone.  The MythBusters tested one hypothesis on the cause of a Christmas tree fire.

Vodka Myths IV
Vodka can...

Episode SP10 – "Holiday Special"
 Original air date: December 6, 2006
The MythBusters test various holiday myths.

If a frozen turkey falls, it can...

The following myths state that a turkey can be cooked with...

The MythBusters tried several household methods in an attempt to prevent a freshly cut Christmas tree from shedding its needles over six weeks. One can keep needles from falling off the Christmas tree by adding... 

The MythBusters created a Rube Goldberg machine using Diet Coke and mentos.

Episode 69 – "22,000-Foot Fall"
 Original air date: December 13, 2006

22,000 Foot Fall

The MythBusters test one version of this story.

Lights On/Off
Throughout the series, Jamie had always pressured his M5 Industries employees and MythBusters production staff to turn the lights off whenever they leave a room to save electricity.  The Build Team tested whether Jamie was correct in his assertion.  During this myth, Grant and Kari visited the Livermore-Pleasanton Fire Department in California to see the Centennial Light.

References

External links

 MythBusters Official site
 

2006 American television seasons
2006